Luis Carlos dos Santos Amorim (born 7 September 1998), commonly known as Luisinho, is a Brazilian footballer who plays as a midfielder for Albanian club Flamurtari.

Career statistics

Club

References

1998 births
Footballers from São Paulo
Living people
Brazilian footballers
Association football midfielders
Sport Club Corinthians Paulista players
Sport Club Atibaia players
Coimbra Esporte Clube players
América Futebol Clube (RN) players
U.D. Oliveirense players
Flamurtari Vlorë players
Campeonato Brasileiro Série D players
Liga Portugal 2 players
Kategoria e Parë players
Brazilian expatriate footballers
Brazilian expatriate sportspeople in Portugal
Expatriate footballers in Portugal
Brazilian expatriate sportspeople in Albania
Expatriate footballers in Albania